Malcolm Peter Jarvis (born 6 December 1955) is a former Zimbabwean cricketer who played in five Test matches and 12 One Day Internationals (ODIs) for the Zimbabwe national cricket team between 1987 and 1995. In the course of his short Test career Jarvis took over the Test match record for the most wickets in a complete career (11) with all dismissals being caught.

Jarvis' son, Kyle Jarvis, plays for the Zimbabwean national team. Jarvis now runs a guesthouse in Borrowdale near Harare with his wife.

References

1955 births
Living people
Sportspeople from Masvingo
Mashonaland cricketers
Zimbabwe Test cricketers
Zimbabwe One Day International cricketers
Zimbabwean cricketers
Cricketers at the 1987 Cricket World Cup
Cricketers at the 1992 Cricket World Cup
Rhodesia cricketers
White Zimbabwean sportspeople